Golog may refer to:

 Golog Tibetan Autonomous Prefecture in Qinghai Province
 Golog Maqin Airport
 Jigme Gyatso (AKA Golog Jigme), a Tibetan filmmaker
 GOLOG, a high-level logic programming language

See also
 Gologan, a river in Romania
 Gologanu, a community in Romania